Hans-Jörg Bullinger ( FREng, born April 13, 1944 in Stuttgart) is a German scientist and former President of the Fraunhofer-Gesellschaft.

The mechanical engineer with a doctoral degree was the Director of the Fraunhofer IAO (since its foundation), besides he is also Professor of Industrial Science and Technology Management at the University of Stuttgart. From 2002 to 2012 he was the President of the Fraunhofer-Gesellschaft. He is also a member of the Scientific Board of AutoUni Wolfsburg.

In 1991, Bullinger was awarded an honorary doctorate from the University of Novi Sad.

From 1963 till 1966 he attended the Technische Oberschule in Stuttgart and passed the Abitur with a second-chance education.

Awards/Titles 
Bullinger is a member of acatech, the German academy of science and engineering.
 1998: Order of the Federal Republic of Germany (Bundesverdienstkreuz), medal and ribbon, awarded for outstanding services to German science, industry and society,
 2003: First Class Order of the Federal Republic of Germany (Bundesverdienstkreuz erster Klasse), awarded for extraordinary services to German science and research
 2006: Order of merit of the Federal Republic of Germany for promoting the transfer of knowledge between science and industry
 2009: Verdienstorden des Landes Baden-Württemberg (Merit of the State of Baden-Wuerttemberg)
 2012: Leonardo European Corporate Learning Award in the "Thought Leadership" category.
 2013: International Fellow of the Royal Academy of Engineering

References

External links 
Academic/Professional Career/Awards/Titles of Hans-Jörg Bullinger
Fraunhofer Gesellschaft FOKUS - Research Institute for Open Communication Systems (FOKUS)

1944 births
Academic staff of the University of Stuttgart
Living people
Scientists from Stuttgart
Knights Commander of the Order of Merit of the Federal Republic of Germany
Recipients of the Order of Merit of Baden-Württemberg
Fraunhofer Society